Countercurrents.org is an India-based news, views and analysis website. It describes itself as non-partisan and taking "the Side of the People!" Countercurrents.org publishes news stories, editorials, and opinion pieces of authors from around the world. It has an international audience.

History
Countercurrents.org was founded by journalist Binu Mathew, and published its first article on 27 March 2002. During the first 16 years of its existence, Countercurrents.org published over 50,000 articles, fact-finding reports, research papers and news items on major social issues around the world.  Countercurrents.org was awarded the 2018 Solidarity Media award by Solidarity Youth Movement in Kerala.

Book and video production
Countercurrents has published three books in 2019. These are The Political Economy of Beef Ban, #MeToo – A Blow to Patriarchy and Connecting the Dots: An Anthology.

Countercurrents coproduced K. P. Sasi's documentary Voices from the Ruins: Kandhamal in Search of Justice on the pogrom against Christians in the Kandhamal district of Odisha.

References 

 Towards A Counter Moveme 
 CounterCurrents.Org (India) : Who Benefits From Nuclear Power Plants In India ?

External links 
 Official website
 Voices From the Ruins – Kandhamal In Search of Justice | Dir: K.P. Sasi 

Indian journalism organisations
Indian news websites
Leftist organisations in India